Dolores Fernández Ochoa (born 16 November 1966) is a Spanish former alpine skier who competed in the 1984 Winter Olympics in the disciplines slalom and giant slalom.

References

1966 births
Living people
Spanish female alpine skiers
Olympic alpine skiers of Spain
Alpine skiers at the 1984 Winter Olympics